Alicja Pęczak (born 13 January 1970 in Bydgoszcz, Kuyavian-Pomeranian) is a retired  breaststroke and medley swimmer from Poland, who competed in two consecutive Summer Olympics for her native country: in 1992 and 1996. A member of Astoria Bydgoszcz and AZS-AWF Gdańsk, she is best known for winning several medals at the FINA Short Course World Championships.

Pęczak was banned for 18 months because of doping use.

References
 

Living people
1970 births
Polish female breaststroke swimmers
Polish female medley swimmers
Swimmers at the 1992 Summer Olympics
Swimmers at the 1996 Summer Olympics
Olympic swimmers of Poland
Astoria Bydgoszcz members
Sportspeople from Bydgoszcz
Medalists at the FINA World Swimming Championships (25 m)
European Aquatics Championships medalists in swimming
Polish sportspeople in doping cases
Universiade medalists in swimming
Universiade silver medalists for Poland
Medalists at the 1991 Summer Universiade
20th-century Polish women
21st-century Polish women